Revenge of the Nerds II: Nerds in Paradise is a 1987 American comedy film, a sequel to Revenge of the Nerds and the second installment in the Revenge of the Nerds series. Its cast featured most of the main actors from its predecessor, including Robert Carradine, Anthony Edwards (albeit in a smaller role), Curtis Armstrong, Larry B. Scott, Timothy Busfield, Donald Gibb, and Andrew Cassese. This film also provided an early starring role for Courtney Thorne-Smith. Other cast members include Bradley Whitford, Ed Lauter, and Barry Sobel.

One of the movie trailers parodies the trailer of Poltergeist II: The Other Side. In the Nerds version, Robert Carradine's character, Lewis, turns and says "We're back!" and laughs. 38 Special provided the title track "Back to Paradise".

Plot
The Lambda Lambda Lambdas from Adams College head to a national fraternity convention in Fort Lauderdale, Florida. Lewis Skolnick's best friend Gilbert Lowe cannot come, due to breaking his leg during a chess game. At the Royal Flamingo Hotel, a trainee named Sunny Carstairs informs Lewis that their reservation is canceled and has been given to the Alpha Betas. The acting manager Buzz explains to Sunny that they do not want nerds staying in the hotel. The Tri-Lambs also meet Sunny's friend Stewart, a geeky bellboy. Poindexter finds a dilapidated hotel called the Hotel Coral Essex, located in a shady neighborhood, and makes their reservation there. Roger Latimer, the president of the local chapter of Alpha Betas (and chairman of the regional conference), along with Ogre and his fellow Alphas plan to get rid of the Tri-Lambs.

Heading to the United Fraternity pre-conference barbecue, the Lambdas end up in the Florida swamplands (intentionally given wrong directions by Roger) and confront a group of Seminole Indians in an ancient Mayan temple, an act concocted by the Alphas to humiliate the Tri-Lambs into leaving the conference. They are captured, forced to strip to their underwear, chased by alligators and later Ogre, and forced to make their way across town back to their hotel in their underwear.

The next day, Roger announces a new bylaw to be voted upon by the conference: "Proposition 15", which would require physical as well as academic standards to be met by all members of the conference. Lewis's argument against the proposition is co-opted by a wet-nightie contest happening poolside. The Lambdas decide to beat the Alphas at their own game and throw a party at the Hotel Coral Essex. The neon sign outside the hotel is deliberately broken so that it reads "Hot oral sex", which draws people for miles. The Tri-Lambs perform a rock/rap "No On 15" song outside of the hotel, winning over the crowd. Prop 15 is voted down the next morning. Roger expresses a desire to make peace with the Tri-Lambs, and to that end he proposes a bylaw stating that any fraternity found guilty of a crime will be expelled from the conference and their charter revoked. The Lambdas, satisfied that the Alphas now cannot attack them without being expelled from the conference, accept their offer of friendship and their luxurious hotel suite at the Royal Flamingo. Roger encourages Sunny to grab a couple of girls and take the Tri-Lambs to the beach in his car. On the beach Sunny and Lewis get to know and like each other. Roger reports his car stolen, and the Lambdas are arrested.

Stewart and Sunny bail the Tri-Lambs out of jail. Sunny apologizes and explains that she knew nothing of Roger's plan, but Lewis does not believe her. The Alpha Betas kidnap the Tri-Lambs along with Sunny and dump them on an uninhabited island. Disgusted by Roger's actions, Sunny jumps overboard. When they realize Ogre cannot be trusted to keep his mouth shut, they also throw him into the water, despite the fact that he cannot swim. Wormser jumps into the ocean and rescues Ogre. After smoking some marijuana Booger discovered on the island, Ogre and the others realize he is not so different from them after all. As the group sleeps Lewis has a dream about Gilbert, who implores Lewis not to give up and points out that Lewis is acting like a jerk to Sunny, who is stranded with him by choice. This helps give Lewis the confidence he needs to apologize to Sunny and try to find a way off the island.

The next morning The Tri-Lambs find a Cuban military officer's hidden cache of military supplies, including an amphibious boat/truck. At the conference, Roger is presiding over the vote to expel the Tri-Lambs, when, decked out in military gear, they crash the conference, driving right through the conference room wall, then chase the attendees out to the pool. Sunny reveals that Roger set them up and kidnapped them. Lewis punches Roger in the jaw, knocking him into the pool. The fraternity council vote Roger and the Alphas out of the fraternity council and revoke their charter.

Back at Adams College, Lewis and Gilbert lead an induction ceremony for the newest member of Lambda Lambda Lambda, Ogre.

Cast
 Robert Carradine as Lewis Skolnick
 Anthony Edwards as Gilbert Lowe
 Curtis Armstrong as Dudley "Booger" Dawson
 Larry B. Scott as Lamar Latrelle
 Timothy Busfield as Arnold Poindexter
 Andrew Cassese as Harold Wormser
 Courtney Thorne-Smith as Sunny Carstairs
 Bradley Whitford as Roger Latimer
 Barry Sobel as Stewart
 James Cromwell as Mr. Skolnick
 Ed Lauter as "Buzz"
 James Hong as Edgar Poe "Snotty" Wong
 Donald Gibb as Frederick Aloysius "Ogre" Palowaski
 Tom Hodges as "Tiny"
 Jack Gilpin as Mr. Comstock
 Michael Fitzgerald as "Pot Roast"

This is the only Nerds film in which Betty does not appear (although a picture of her can be seen at the beginning of the film). Stan Gable, Takashi, and U.N. Jefferson also do not appear. This is the last Nerds film to feature Poindexter. Although he is shown on the DVD cover of the fourth film, he is not seen nor mentioned in it. This is also the last Nerds film to include Anthony Edwards as Gilbert and Andrew Cassese as Wormser. Edwards did not like the script and was very reluctant to reprise his role, and only agreed to return when his scenes were scheduled to be filmed very quickly and without any location filming (the script was changed so Gilbert had a broken leg, which enabled Edwards to film almost all of his material in one session, and he spent a few days filming the scene where he appears in Lewis' dream). They are played by other actors in the third film and stay offscreen in the fourth and final film.

At a 30th anniversary of the original film in 2014, Julia Montgomery (Betty) told that she was originally to have a part in Nerds II, but eventually turned it down after learning that her only scene would involve Betty cheating on Lewis in a hotel room with another 'jock'. Montgomery felt that after falling in love with Lewis towards the end of Nerds, that it wasn't right that she would cheat on him with someone who was just like Stan Gable.

Reception 
The film received mostly negative reviews from critics. It holds a 7% rating on Rotten Tomatoes based on 27 reviews with an average score of 3.67/10. The critical consensus reads: "It reunites most of the original cast and rounds them up for a trip to Fort Lauderdale for spring break, but Revenge of the Nerds II: Nerds in Paradise forgets to pack enough jokes or compelling characters to make it through its 89-minute running time." Hal Hinson, writing in The Washington Post, derided the film's lowbrow style, and also called it "the closest thing to a comedy desert I've ever seen. I'm talking no laughs. Nada. (Okay, one laugh, when one of the nerds -- Booger -- shows up wearing a T-shirt with 'Who Farted?' on the front. But if that's the peak of your comedy pyramid, you're in big trouble.)"

Roger Ebert, reviewing the film for the Chicago Sun Times, criticized the film's shallow understanding of what it means to be a nerd, the lack of laughs, and particularly the unlikable characters, elaborating that "National Lampoon's Animal House succeeded in creating unforgettable characters. Nerds II just has a bunch of guys schlepping around wishing somebody had written some dialogue for them." Michael Wilmington of the Los Angeles Times commented that both of the Nerds films seemed to rely on having a built-in audience of people who were ostracized during adolescence in lieu of a good story or good jokes, but that where the original at least was "erratically funny", the sequel offered nothing but forced and unfunny gags. He also criticized the brutish means by which the "nerds" achieve victory, saying it makes it "hard to see much difference between their values and the ones of those tormenting them." David Sterritt similarly criticized the nerd's triumph in The Christian Science Monitor: "If these guys are so smart, why do they win their final victory with nothing more subtle than a punch in the mouth, backed up by a military tank?"

Box office
Despite the negative reviews, the film was a box office success.

References

External links

1980s sex comedy films
1980s teen comedy films
1987 comedy films
1987 films
20th Century Fox films
American sequel films
American sex comedy films
American teen comedy films
1980s English-language films
Films about fraternities and sororities
Films about school bullying
Films directed by Joe Roth
Films scored by Mark Mothersbaugh
Films set in Florida
Films shot in Florida
Interscope Communications films
Revenge Of The Nerds 2
Teen sex comedy films
1980s American films